The 2012 ITF Women's Circuit is the 2012 edition of the second tier tour for women's professional tennis. It is organised by the International Tennis Federation and is a tier below the WTA Tour. The ITF Women's Circuit includes tournaments with prize money ranging from $10,000 up to $100,000. During the months of January to March 2012, 88 tournaments were held.

Key

Month

January

February

March

See also 
 2012 WTA Tour
 2012 WTA Challenger Tour
 2012 ATP World Tour
 2012 ATP Challenger Tour
 2012 ITF Women's Circuit
 2012 ITF Men's Circuit
 Women's Tennis Association
 International Tennis Federation

External links 
 International Tennis Federation (ITF)
 ATP World Tour

 1